La Familia are a Romanian hip hop group from Sălăjan, Bucharest. Founded in 1996 by Dragoș "Puya" Gărdescu and Tudor Sișu, they have been widely regarded as pioneers of the gangsta rap subgenre in their native Romania. Mentored by fellow gangsta rap group B.U.G. Mafia, they quickly emerged as one of Romania's most popular rap acts in the late 1990s and early 2000s. 
In 2003, group member Tudor Sișu was sentenced to three years in prison after being arrested by Romanian authorities in a widely publicized drug-trafficking case. The group also lost the rights to its name after a public feud with former mentors B.U.G. Mafia, whom they had lyrically attacked in an unreleased song the previous year. Group member Puya worked mostly individually on their 2004 effort, before managing to recover the rights for the band's name following a lengthy court trial. 

In late 2005, Sișu was paroled and the group resumed its activity before finally disbanding in 2011. This followed a string of failed attempts at releasing a comeback album. Gărdescu and Sișu have remained cordial, reuniting frequently on each other's solo efforts and occasionally for live performances. 

In 2017, they reunited as La Familia and released their ninth studio album independently.

Discography
 1997 - Băieți de Cartier (Homeboys)
 1998 - Nicăieri Nu-i ca Acasă (Ain't No Place Like Home)
 1999 - Bine Ai Venit în Paradis (Welcome to Paradise)
 2000 - Ca la Noi (As We Do It)
 2001 - Familiarizează-te (Get Used to It)
 2003 - Punct şi de la Capăt (Full Stop. New Paragraph)
 2004 - Foame de Bani (Money Hunger)
 2006 - O Mare Familie (One Big Family)
 2017 - Codul Bunelor Maniere (The Code of Good Manners)

References

External links
Official website
La Familia on Discogs

Romanian hip hop groups
G-funk groups
Gangsta rap groups
Musical groups from Bucharest